Haycocknema perplexum are nematodes which reside in tissues under the skin or in blood vessels. The origin of these parasites and their natural hosts are not known at this time. This group is around 8% of nematode species which affect vertebrates. Clinical symptoms of this parasite include eosinophilia and high levels of creatine kinase. While rare with only thirteen documented cases, all originating in Australia, this parasite can become fatal if untreated due to the muscles of the respiratory system becoming unable to function properly.

The first case was documented in 1998, and no cases in non-human animals have been reported as of 2022. Only one documented death from complications of infection with the parasite has been recorded.

The treatment for this parasite is 400 mg of Abendazole. This broad spectrum medication is an antihelmintic drug that can treat diseases by impairing the parasite's ability to absorb glucose, resulting in its death.

References 

 Haycocknema perplexum: [Internet]. Wildlifehealthaustralia.com.au. 2018 [cited 26 March 2018]. Available from: https://www.wildlifehealthaustralia.com.au/Portals/0/Documents/FactSheets/Public%20health/Haycocknema%20perplexum%20Mar%202008%20(1.1).pdf
 Albendazole [Internet]. Pubchem.ncbi.nlm.nih.gov. 2018 [cited 26 March 2018]. Available from: https://pubchem.ncbi.nlm.nih.gov/compound/albendazole#section=Top

Enoplea
Parasitic nematodes of humans
Nematodes described in 1999